D. Vedavyas Kamath is an Indian politician belonging to Bharatiya Janata Party(BJP). He was elected to the 15th Karnataka Assembly from Mangaluru City South constituency in Dakshina Kannada.He has transformed Mangalore City to a Greater level in Terms of Development everywhere in his Constituency before completing his First term. He is one of the Most loved Member of Legislative Assembly in Dakshina Kannada District.

Early life 

Kamath was born on December 7, 1977, in Kundapura to D. Vaman Kamath and Tara V. Kamath. He has three siblings. He completed his primary and high school education in Canara School. He completed his BCom from Canara College, Mangalore. Kamath joined the Rashtriya Swayamsevak Sangh in his childhood as a volunteer.

Political career 

Kamath served for a year as the general secretary of the Mangalore South BJP unit. In 2017, he was elected as Member of Legislative Assembly by a record number of 86,545 votes.

Social Work 

Kamath founded Sevanjali Charitable Trust to serve the poor and helpless 17 years ago. The trust supports more than 70 elderly people financially,  school fees to the poor and meritorious students, and hospital expenses for the poor. Blood donation camps are conducted several times every year. The trust matched ‘Stem Cells‘ for a needy child, from Mumbai. Trust has adopted Kadalakere Government School, Moodbidri where more than 150 economically poor students are studying.

He's involved in Padavinangadi Ganeshostsava, Anna Santarpane by Mangala Cashew industries, Bhatkala Ganapathi temple, Car street Venkatramana Temple, etc. He is also the director of Bhuvanendra Cooperative Bank Mangalore. He has served as director of the Digantha Press. He has also renovated the Siddapura Venkataramana Education Trust at Kundpaura.

References 

Year of birth missing (living people)
Living people
Bharatiya Janata Party politicians from Karnataka